

Professional career 
Andreas Schwer studied aerospace engineering at the University of Stuttgart from 1987 to 1992. In 1997 he earned a Ph.D. in this subject with a research project at the European Space Agency (ESA). From 1999 to 2000 he completed his master's in space systems engineering at the Universiteit Delft while already working for Airbus.

Schwer initially worked for Airbus in the space division from 1995 to 2004 and as head of engineering in the helicopter division from 2004 to 2008. From 2008 to 2012 he was CTO and Executive Vice-president at The Manitowoc Company (USA). From 2013 to 2017 he was with member of the Rheinmetall-Defence executive management board, CEO its Combat System division and, from 2016, CEO of Rheinmetall International. In 2018 he was the inaugural CEO of Saudi Arabian Military Industries building up the company from greenfield into a significant defense industrial enterprise by entering into strategic cooperations with many international defence OEM. 

Schwer has been chairman and board member of the Australian metal 3D-printer manufacturer Titomic since July 2020.

Dr Schwer was appointed Group CEO of the Australian headquartered EOS (Electro Optic Systems) in August 2022.

Private life 
Andreas Schwer lived in Meersburg at the Lake of Constance until 2017. In Meersburg he was involved in as an organist in the Catholic parish of Mariä Heimsuchung.

External links 
 Andreas Schwer at bloomberg.com
 Andreas Schwer at LinkedIn

References 

Living people
German chief executives
1966 births